United Nations Security Council resolution 740, adopted unanimously on 7 February 1992, after reaffirming resolutions 713 (1991), 721 (1991), 724 (1991) and 727 (1992) and considering a report by the Secretary-General Boutros Boutros-Ghali, the Council approved plans for a peacekeeping mission in the Socialist Federal Republic of Yugoslavia.

The Council expressed its desire to deploy the force after the "remaining obstacle in the way" is removed, calling on the Serbian leaders to accept the United Nations peace plan. Then Croatian President Franjo Tuđman had accepted the plan. It also approved the increase of the military liaison commission to a total of 75 officers, up from 50.

The resolution went on to call on all parties to co-operate with the Conference on Yugoslavia to reach a settlement of the issue consistent with the principles of the Organization for Security and Co-operation in Europe, and also to all states to continue to observe the arms embargo on the country.

See also
 Arbitration Commission of the Peace Conference on the former Yugoslavia
 Bosnian War
 Croatian War of Independence
 List of United Nations Security Council Resolutions 701 to 800 (1991–1993)
 Slovenian Independence War
 United Nations Protection Force
 Yugoslav Wars

References

External links
 
Text of the Resolution at undocs.org

 0740
 0740
1992 in Yugoslavia
1992 in Croatia
 0740
February 1992 events